Xanthorhoe mediofascia is a species of moth of the family Geometridae first described by Alfred Ernest Wileman in 1915. It is found in Taiwan.

References

Moths described in 1915
Xanthorhoe
Moths of Taiwan